Gaetano or Cayetano Palmaroli (1801 – December 1, 1853)  was an Italian painter, but mostly remembered as a lithographer.

He was born in Fermo, but studied painting in Rome under Tommaso Minardi, and there gained the patronage of the Spanish ambassador who recruited him to paint for the Spanish monarchy. There he made lithographic prints of the works collected in the Prado Museum and  Palace of El Escorial.  He was knighted into the order of Order of Isabella the Catholic. He left Spain in 1841, with the exile of the Queen Mother, Maria Cristina de Borbon, and returned to Fermo. In 1848, he left Fermo due to the local revolts, and he ultimately died in Madrid, Spain. He was the father of Vicente Palmaroli, who became a prominent genre painter in Spain and became director of the Prado Museum.

References

1801 births
1853 deaths
19th-century Italian painters
Italian male painters
Spanish painters
Italian engravers
19th-century Italian male artists